Antonio Rozzi (born 28 May 1994) is an Italian footballer who play like atacante.

Club career

Lazio
Rozzi was first promoted to the Lazio first team during the 2011–12 season, making his Serie A debut in Lazio's first league win over Milan for 14 years. He came on as an injury time substitute for captain Tommaso Rocchi.

Loans
Rozzi joined Real Madrid Castilla on loan from 2 September 2013.

On 31 July 2014 he joined Bari. On 23 January 2015 he joined Virtus Entella.

On 3 August 2015 he moved to Lanciano. In January 2016 he was signed by Siena.

On 31 August 2016 Rozzi was signed by Lupa Roma in another loan.

Statistics
Statistics accurate as of match played 1 July 2013

References

External links
 

Living people
1994 births
Italian footballers
S.S. Lazio players
Serie A players
Serie B players
Association football forwards
Footballers from Rome
Segunda División players
Real Madrid Castilla footballers
Real Madrid CF players
Virtus Entella players
S.S. Virtus Lanciano 1924 players
A.C.N. Siena 1904 players
Expatriate footballers in Spain
Italian expatriate footballers
Italian expatriate sportspeople in Andorra
Italian expatriate sportspeople in Spain
Expatriate footballers in Andorra